Johan Hörner (28 January 1711, Edebo, in Roslagen - 4 March 1763, Copenhagen) was a Swedish-born Danish portrait painter.

Biography
He began his studies with Johan Henrik Scheffel in Stockholm and worked there for a time. However, as a Pietist (a member of a sect that was out of favor with the established church), he faced serious discrimination. As a result, he moved to Denmark in 1734, where he took lodging with a carpenter in a district of Copenhagen that was largely Pietist.

For a time, he helped find refuge for other self-exiled Swedes, but soon came under scrutiny for his activities and moved to the country. In 1741, a new wave of Pietist refugees arrived in Copenhagen; including Sven Rosén, a major figure in the movement. He also received assistance from Hörner.

Hörner attempted to win an appointment as court painter but, despite the fact that King Christian VI was sympathetic to the Pietists, he was not accepted. It has been suggested that his style was too realistic and the King wanted portraits that were more idealized. A sample portrait of Crown Prince Frederick does, in fact, present him as rather less attractive than he appears in other contemporary portraits.

Instead, he found work portraying the clergy and the well-to-do bourgeoisie. He also produced cabinet paintings, family portraits, still lifes and "Natstykker" (paintings set at night, lit only by candles or a fire), which were very popular. Many of his portraits from the 1750s show the influence of Carl Gustaf Pilo and Balthasar Denner. He became a regular attendee of the artistic salons held at the home of Johanna Marie Fosie; the first such salon in Denmark.

His works are unsigned and many may not have been identified. A portrait of the naval officer, was first determined to be his as recently as 2007. Among his most familiar portraits are those of Hans Egede, Lauritz de Thurah and Hans Adolph Brorson.

References

External links 

ArtNet: More works by and attributed to Hörner.

1711 births
1763 deaths
Danish portrait painters
18th-century Swedish painters
18th-century Swedish male artists
Swedish male painters
Swedish emigrants to Denmark
Radical Pietism